Pseudopostega colognatha is a moth of the family Opostegidae. It was described by Donald R. Davis and Jonas R. Stonis, 2007. It is known from Puerto Rico.

The length of the forewings is 1.8–2.1 mm. Adults have been recorded in August.

Etymology
The species name is derived from the Greek kolos (meaning shortened, stunted) and gnathos (meaning jaw), in reference to the short, blunt apex of the gnathos as viewed ventrally.

References

Opostegidae
Moths described in 2007